Peter Pierre Childs (November 15, 1871 – February 15, 1922) was an infielder in Major League Baseball in 1901 and 1902. He played for the St. Louis Cardinals, Chicago Orphans, and the Philadelphia Phillies.

References

External links

Chicago Orphans players
St. Louis Cardinals players
Philadelphia Phillies players
1871 births
1922 deaths
Major League Baseball second basemen
Baseball players from Pennsylvania
Minor league baseball managers
Philadelphia Colts players
Harrisburg Senators players
Hazleton Quay-kers players
Philadelphia Athletics (minor league) players
Hartford Cooperatives players
Reading Coal Heavers players
Bristol Bell Makers players
Utica Reds players
Louisville Colonels (minor league) players
Toledo Mud Hens players
Amsterdam-Gloversville-Johnstown Hyphens players
Amsterdam-Gloversville-Johnstown Jags players
Greenville Spinners players
Portsmouth Cobblers players